Higher Ground is the fifth studio album by Canadian country music artist Joan Kennedy. It was released by MCA Records in 1992. The album peaked at number 24 on the RPM Country Albums chart.

Track listing
"You Said It" – 3:08
"I Need to Hear It from You" – 2:59
"Dream On" – 3:57
"I've Seen Enough to Know" – 3:20
"Breakin' All Over Town" – 3:05
"Countin' on You This Time" – 3:45
"Talk to My Heart" – 3:34
"Appalachian Gold" – 2:44
"Circle of Love" – 4:03
"Love Is a Leap of Faith" – 2:26
"Higher Ground" – 4:15

Chart performance

References

External links
[ Higher Ground] at Allmusic

1992 albums
Joan Kennedy (musician) albums
MCA Records albums